Rothschild's lobe-billed bird-of-paradise (Loborhamphus nobilis), also known as the noble lobe-bill, is one of six enigmatic species of bird-of-paradise collected in Papua New Guinea for zoologist Walter Rothschild, 2nd Baron Rothschild.  It is only known from the holotype.

In 1930 it, along with the five other collected species, was considered by Erwin Stresemann to be a hybrid, presumptively between the long-tailed paradigalla and the superb bird-of-paradise, though doubts have been raised about the parentage.

Notes

References
 Newton, Michael. "Encyclopedia of Cryptozoology: A Global Guide." McFarland & Company, January 2005. .
 Fuller. "The Lost Birds of Paradise." Voyageur Press, January 1997. .

Hybrid birds of paradise
Birds of Papua New Guinea
Rothschild's lobe-billed bird-of-paradise
Taxa named by Walter Rothschild
Intergeneric hybrids